Katarina Srebotnik and Ai Sugiyama were the defending champions, but Srebotnik chose not to participate, and only Sugiyama competed that year.
Sugiyama partnered with Ayumi Morita, but lost in the quarterfinals to Květa Peschke and Rennae Stubbs.

Cara Black and Liezel Huber won in the final 6–1, 6–1 against Maria Kirilenko and Flavia Pennetta.

Seeds
The top four seeds received a bye into the second round.

Draw

Finals

Top half

Bottom half

External links
Draw

Cup - Doubles